This is a list of the Regionally Important Geological / Geomorphological Sites RIGS in Cumbria

LGS sites are designated and archived through an on-going review process. To view the full current list go to www.cumbriageoconservation.org.uk

 Armathwaite Dyke  
 Banks Gate, North Stainmore 
 Belah Scar, Brough Sowerby  
 Bowderdale 
 Bullman Hills, North Pennines 
 Church Lane, Church Brough  
 Cocklock Scar, Kirkland  
 Coombe Clints, Armathwaite  
 Dufton Ghyll Woods, Appleby   
 Hags Bank, Alston Moor  
 High Cup Nick, Dufton  
 Howhill Quarry, Alston  
 Knock Pike, Flagdaw  
 Lacy's Caves, Little Salkeld 
 Langdale Beck, Howgills  
 Nateby West  
 Scale Beck, Gaythorne Plain, Orton  
 Shap Abbey  
 Smardale Bridge  
 Smardale Gill Limestone Quarry  
 Stenkrith Park, Kirkby Stephen   
 Wild Boar Fell, Mallerstang

References

Regionally Important Geological Geomorphological Sites